Barbara Taylor Bradford  (born 10 May 1933) is a best-selling British-American novelist. Her debut novel, A Woman of Substance, was published in 1979 and sold over 30 million copies worldwide. She wrote 39 novels, all bestsellers in England and the United States.

Writing career 
In her youth, Barbara read Charles Dickens, the Brontë sisters, Thomas Hardy, and Colette.  At age ten she decided to be a writer after sending a story to a magazine. She was paid seven 7s 6d for the story, with which she bought handkerchiefs and a green vase for her parents.

Barbara left school at 15. She became a reporter for the Yorkshire Evening Post after working briefly in their typing pool. While a reporter, she worked alongside Keith Waterhouse.

She moved to London at the age 20 where she became the fashion editor of Woman's Own magazine, and later a columnist for the London Evening News. She later wrote an interior decoration column syndicated to 183 newspapers.

Her first fiction writing efforts were four suspense novels, which she later abandoned. Taylor Bradford would subsequently describe "interviewing herself", saying that "I was in my late thirties. I thought: what if I get to 55, and I've never written a novel? I'm going to hate myself. I'm going to be one of those bitter, unfulfilled writers."

Her debut novel, A Woman of Substance, became an enduring best-seller and, according to Reuters, ranks as one of the top-ten best-selling novels of all time. It was followed by 38 other novels, all bestsellers in England and the United States.

Taylor Bradford's works have sold more than 92 million copies worldwide in more than 90 countries and 40 languages.

Taylor Bradford considers Irish historian and author Cornelius Ryan her literary mentor. Ryan encouraged her writing and was the first person (other than her mother) to whom she had confided her literary ambitions. Her favourite contemporary authors are P. D. James, Bernard Cornwell, and Ruth Rendell.

Recurring plotlines and common themes 
A common pattern in her novels is a young woman of humble background rising in business through years of hard work, often involving enormous self-sacrifice. As Taylor Bradford is often quoted: "I write about mostly ordinary women who go on to achieve the extraordinary."

Film adaptations 
Ten of Taylor Bradford's books were made into television mini-series and television movies, produced by her husband Robert E. Bradford.

Five of her television adaptations were rereleased on DVD in the UK in September 2008 by Acorn Media UK:

 A Woman of Substance
 Hold The Dream
 To Be The Best
 Act of Will
 Voice of the Heart

A Woman of Substance, Hold The Dream, and To Be The Best were reissued on DVD by Acorn Media in the US in May 2012. Act of Will and Voice of the Heart remain available on DVD in the U.S. through Infinity Video.

Personal life
Barbara Taylor was born in Leeds, Yorkshire, England to Freda and Winston Taylor. Her father Winston was an engineer who lost his leg serving in the First World War.

Taylor Bradford's biographer, Piers Dudgeon, uncovered evidence that her mother Freda was the illegitimate daughter of Frederick Robinson, 2nd Marquess of Ripon, a local Yorkshire aristocrat. Freda's mother was a servant of the Marquess. Dudgeon informed Taylor Bradford that her grandmother and the Marquess had three children. After some hesitation, Taylor Bradford allowed Dudgeon to publish her biography. Although initially angry at Dudgeon's discovery, she later said that "I came round. There's no stigma now." Her grandmother later spent time in a workhouse. Taylor Bradford explored her ancestor's workhouses in the ITV television series Secrets of the Workhouse (2013).

Barbara's older brother Vivian died of meningitis before she was born. She later described her mother as having "put all her frustrated love into me." Her parents' marriage is fictionalized in her 1986 novel An Act of Will.

Barbara and fellow Yorkshire writer Alan Bennett attended the same nursery school in the Leeds suburb of Upper Armley. As a child during the Second World War, she held a jumble sale at her school and donated the £2 proceeds to the "Aid to Russia" fund. She later received a handwritten thank-you letter from Clementine Churchill, the wife of Prime Minister Winston Churchill.

She met her husband, American film producer Robert E. Bradford, on a blind date in 1961 after being introduced by the English screenwriter Jack Davies. They married on Christmas Eve 1963, and moved permanently to the United States. Taylor Bradford became an American citizen in 1992.

In December 2013, Taylor Bradford auctioned 40 pieces of jewellery given to her by her husband at Bonhams in London. She donated the proceeds to two relatives in England.

Taylor Bradford received an honorary doctorate from Leeds University, the University of Bradford, Mount St. Mary's College, Sienna College, and Post University. She was made an Officer of the Order of the British Empire (OBE) by Queen Elizabeth II as part of the 2007 Birthday Honours for her contributions to literature. Her original manuscripts are archived at the Leeds University Brotherton Library Special Collections beside those of the Brontë sisters. In 2017, Bradford Taylor was recognised as one of 90 "Great Britons" to commemorate the Queen's 90th birthday.

Taylor Bradford's wealth is estimated at between £166–174 million, leading to rumours that she owns 2,000 pairs of shoes and that her former Connecticut home's lake was heated for the benefit of her swans. Taylor Bradford addressed the rumours in a 2011 interview, tracing the shoes rumour to a joke and the heated lake to the previous owners of the house who had installed it on part of the lake to provide an ice-free area for a pair of swans in winter.

In 1990 she was the subject of This Is Your Life where she was surprised by Michael Aspel at Heathrow Airport.

Her husband died in 2019. Taylor Bradford lives in Manhattan, New York City.

Selected works

Fiction
The Emma Harte Saga
 A Woman of Substance (1979)
 Hold the Dream (1985)
 To Be the Best (1988)
 Emma's Secret (2003)
 Unexpected Blessings (2005)
 Just Rewards (2005)
 Breaking the Rules (2009)
 A Man of Honour (2021)
The Ravenscar Trilogy
 The Ravenscar Dynasty (2006)
 Heirs of Ravenscar (2007) (published as The Heir in the U.S.)
 Being Elizabeth (2008)
The Cavendon Chronicles
 Cavendon Hall (2014)
 The Cavendon Women (2015)
 The Cavendon Luck (2016)
 Secrets of Cavendon (2017)

The House of Falconer

Master of His Fate (2018)
In the Lion's Den (2020)

Other fiction
 Act of Will (1986)
 The Women in His Life (1990)
 Remember (1991)
 Angel (1993)
 Voice of the Heart (1983)
 Everything to Gain (1994)
 Dangerous to Know (1995)
 Love in Another Town (1995)
 Her Own Rules (1996)
 A Secret Affair (1996)
 Power of a Woman (1997)
 A Sudden Change of Heart (1999)
 Where You Belong (2000)
 The Triumph of Katie Byrne (2001) (NL, De wereld aan haar voeten)
 Three Weeks in Paris (2002)
 Playing the Game (2010) (NL, Liefdesspel)
 Letter From a Stranger (2011) (NL, De geheime brief)
 Secrets From the Past (2013)
 Hidden (2013) (published as an eBook)
 Treacherous (2014) (published as an eBook)
 Who Are You? (2016) (published as an eBook)
 Damaged (2018) (published as an eBook)

Non-fiction
 A Garland of Children's Verse (1960)
 The Dictionary of 1001 Famous People: Outstanding Personages in the World of Science, the Arts, Music and Literature (with Samuel Nisenson, 1966)
 Etiquette to Please Him (How to be the Perfect Wife series) (1969)
 Bradford's Living Romantically Every Day (2002)
Interior design
 The Complete Encyclopedia of Homemaking Ideas (1968)
 Easy Steps to Successful Decorating (Illustrated) (1971)
 How to Solve Your Decorating Problems (1976)
 Making Space Grow (1979)
 Luxury Designs for Apartment Living (1983)
 Christian books
 Children's Stories of Jesus from the New Testament (1966)
 Children's Stories of the Bible from the Old Testament (1966)
 Children's Stories of the Bible from the Old and New Testaments (1968)

References

External links
Official USA website
Official UK website
Barbara Taylor Bradford's blog

 Archival material at 

1933 births
Living people
American religious writers
American women novelists
British non-fiction writers
British religious writers
British romantic fiction writers
British women novelists
British emigrants to the United States
Officers of the Order of the British Empire
People from Armley
Writers from Leeds
20th-century British novelists
21st-century British novelists
20th-century American novelists
21st-century American novelists
Women romantic fiction writers
Women religious writers
American women non-fiction writers
20th-century American non-fiction writers
21st-century American non-fiction writers
20th-century American women writers
21st-century American women writers